Federico Pasqualoni (born 19 March 1997) is a former Italian football player.

Club career
He made his Serie C debut for Cosenza on 21 October 2017 in a game against Bisceglie.

He had to retire from playing at the age of 22 due to ACL rupture.

References

External links
 

1997 births
Footballers from Rome
Living people
Italian footballers
Association football defenders
Cosenza Calcio players
Casertana F.C. players
Serie C players